The M864 is an American made 155 mm artillery shell. It carries a dual-purpose ICM submunition warhead and incorporates base bleed technology to increase its range. The projectile is capable of delivering 24 M46 and 48 M42 dual-purpose anti-materiel/anti-personnel sub-munitions at ranges out to 29 kilometers. Base bleed technology was developed to reduce the amount of base drag on a projectile, thereby increasing the achieved range. The drag is reduced by a gas generator located on the base of the projectile. Once ignited, the gas generator bleeds hot gas into the projectiles wake which causes the flow of air at the base to be less turbulent. The decrease in turbulence, reduces base drag, which typically accounts for 50 percent of total drag. The amount of thrust produced by the base burner unit is negligible and does not serve the same function as the rocket motor on a rocket-assisted projectile (RAP).

The M864 projectile is not ballistically matched to any projectile currently in the inventory, but because of the similarity of the trajectories, firing data for the M864 can be determined from the M549A1 firing data.

Specifications

 Range 29 km
 Weight as fired: 
 Explosive content:
 
 Length
 Body diameter: 154.89 mm
 Driving band diameter:
 Fuzes (with supplemental charge):

 Fuzes (without supplemental charge):

 Manufacturer:

See also
Dual-Purpose Improved Conventional Munition
List of artillery
List of crew served weapons of the US Armed Forces

References
 Jane's Ammunition Handbook 2003–2004

External links

Artillery shells
Cold War artillery of the United States
155 mm artillery